Variable geometry may refer to:

Variable-geometry turbocharger
Variable geometry turbomachine
Variable geometry Europe, a proposed strategy for European integration
Variable Geometry Self-Propelled Battle Droid
Variable-sweep wing
 Wing configuration#Variable geometry ways to alter the shape of an aircraft's wings in flight in order to alter their aerodynamic properties
Anglo-French Variable Geometry (AFVG) aircraft project